"Going Bad" is a song by the American rapper Meek Mill featuring the Canadian rapper Drake. It was the first single released from his album Championships (2018) on January 22, 2019, to US urban contemporary radio. The music video was teased in February 2019 and also released that month. The single was Mill's first and Drake's 24th number one single on Billboards Rhythmic Songs chart in its March 30, 2019, issue.

Music video
On February 6, 2019, a 30-second clip was put on Mill's Instagram page teasing the music video. It was officially released in full on February 7. The video was directed by Kid Art, and has Mill and Drake taking part in lavish activities typically associated with wealthy people. It was released in 2019 during Black History Month. T.I., Nipsey Hussle, Mustard, Swizz Beatz, Shy Glizzy, PnB Rock, J. Prince and YK Osiris are included in the music video, alongside Mill and Drake.

Charts

Weekly charts

Year-end charts

Certifications

Release history

References

2018 songs
2019 singles
Drake (musician) songs
Meek Mill songs
Song recordings produced by Wheezy (record producer)
Songs written by Drake (musician)
Songs written by Meek Mill
Songs written by Wheezy (record producer)
Songs written by Westen Weiss